Derek Lam (born 1967) is an American fashion designer. In addition to designing his own line, Lam was Tod's creative director for ready-to-wear and accessories from 2005 until 2010.

Background

Lam was born in San Francisco, California and is of Chinese American parentage. Lam is the youngest of three children in his fourth-generation family. His parents had a business that imported clothes from Asia, and his grandparents ran a successful garment factory in San Francisco that specialized in bridal and wedding dresses. Lam graduated in 1990 from Parsons School of Design in Manhattan.

Career

Lam began working as an assistant for Michael Kors in the 90s and worked there for four years. Lam then moved to Hong Kong to work for a large retail brand. Following his Hong Kong experience, Derek returned to New York and was appointed vice President of Design for Michael Kors' Kors line.

In 2003, he launched his own label. He debuted at the New York Fashion Week in September 2003.  In 2005, Lam won the runner-up prize in the CFDA/Vogue Fashion Fund competition as well as the CFDA Perry Ellis Swarovski Award for new designers. In addition to clothes, Derek Lam and Derek Lam 10 Crosby brands have shoes, handbags and eyewear collections. In February 2010, Derek Lam launched an  e-commerce website selling the collections of ready-to-wear and accessories. In 2015, a fragrance collection was launched under the Derek Lam 10 Crosby brand.

In 2009, Lam opened a store designed by the Japanese architecture firm, SANAA, but it eventually closed.

In January 2020, Public Clothing Company acquired the Derek Lam brand. Lam remains the Chief Creative Officer of the Derek Lam business, including Derek Lam 10 Crosby. He closed his luxury collection to focus more on Derek Lam 10 Crosby and its expansion to contemporary styles. Regarding the sale, Lam said in an interview, “Dan and his team have a tremendous opportunity to grow the branded business, both geographically and with new product categories. There’s a huge opportunity in international that has essentially been untapped."

Lam is also incorporating sustainable fashion into his collections. Lam is using non-chromed leather and eco-viscose in his designs. Use of recycled cashmere and polyester and raw eco materials in knitwear are also areas he is expanding upon.

In one of his interview Lam said the most challenging part my job is many people are using the product now and its not only about me if I want to launch any new design, we always have in our mind people are going the use and there will be huge response from them. Know more about Interview

Personal life

Lam is married to Jan Hendrik-Schlottmann (born 1964/65), also his business partner. Lam lives in Gramercy Park, Manhattan.

Filmography 
Seamless, 2005

See also
 Chinese people in New York City
 LGBT culture in New York City
 List of LGBT people from New York City

References

External links
 Official website

American fashion designers of Chinese descent
American fashion designers
Parsons School of Design alumni
Artists from San Francisco
High fashion brands
1967 births
Living people
LGBT fashion designers
American gay artists
LGBT people from California
American LGBT people of Asian descent
21st-century American LGBT people